The 2006 Skyrunner World Series was the 5th edition of the global skyrunning competition, Skyrunner World Series, organised by the International Skyrunning Federation from 2002.

Results
The World Cup has developed in 8 races from May to September.

Final rankings

Men
1st  Ricardo Mejía - 400 points
2nd  Agusti Roc - 342 points
3rd  Fulvio Dapit - 322 points

Women
1st  Angela Mudge - 456 points
2nd  Corinne Favre - 408 points
3rd  Ester Hernández - 394 points

References

External links
 Skyrunner World Series

2006